Nevermore was an American heavy metal band from Seattle, Washington, formed in 1991. The band has been inactive since 2011, due to personal issues between the band members. In April 2015, lead singer Warrel Dane confirmed that Nevermore had not disbanded, and there was a possibility for them to continue in the next two years with another album. However, Dane died in December 2017, ending hopes of a reunion.

History

Early years (1992–1993)
Nevermore started in the beginning of the 1990s, when the band Sanctuary was pressured by its recording label to change its musical style, switching from heavy metal to grunge, which was obtaining mainstream success at the time due to bands such as Nirvana and Pearl Jam (both, incidentally, also from Seattle). Two members of the band – vocalist Warrel Dane and bassist Jim Sheppard — did not agree with the change, and thus proceeded to create a project of their own: Nevermore.

Nevermore, In Memory and The Politics of Ecstasy (1994–1996)
By the end of 1994, the band assumed a stable lineup, which saw the additions of drummer Van Williams and former Sanctuary touring guitarist Jeff Loomis. In 1995 Nevermore released its debut album through Century Media Records. This album received much attention and specialized review, as its release was followed by a European tour with Blind Guardian and a North American tour with Death.

Second guitarist Pat O'Brien joined the band prior to the release of the EP In Memory and also took part in the recording of the subsequent album The Politics of Ecstasy, both from 1996. O'Brien left Nevermore to play in Cannibal Corpse and Curran Murphy from Shatter Messiah was enlisted as a touring guitarist for the band until Tim Calvert (who played for the band Forbidden) was able to join the band.

Dreaming Neon Black and Dead Heart in a Dead World (1999–2001)
Three years without releases followed, but in 1999, the album Dreaming Neon Black was released. The album's lyrics, based partly on the events Warrell Dane underwent after the disappearance of his longtime girlfriend, narrate the story of a man's slow decline into madness, subsequent to the death of the only woman he ever loved. The tracks of this album are varied in style, ranging from slow and melodic to aggressive and progressive.

A long tour followed with Nevermore sharing stages with bands such as Mercyful Fate, Arch Enemy, Iced Earth, and Opeth. After the end of the tour, in 2000, guitarist Tim Calvert announced his departure from the band, subsequent to his marriage. Instead of finding a replacement, the band decided to continue as a quartet, hiring session guitarists for live appearances, such as Curran Murphy (who went on to play in Annihilator) and Chris Broderick of Jag Panzer and Megadeth. Nevermore proceeded to record Dead Heart in a Dead World, which was followed by tours with several bands, most notably with In Flames and Shadows Fall in late 2000 and Savatage in 2001.

Enemies of Reality and This Godless Endeavor (2003–2007)
The band's fifth album, Enemies of Reality, remained in production for over a year, and was released in 2003. This album faced much criticism for its production and was re-released in 2005, after being remixed by Andy Sneap. On tour, the band was joined by second lead guitarist Steve Smyth, formerly of Vicious Rumors and Testament; Smyth was eventually added to the line-up on a permanent basis.

A sixth album, This Godless Endeavor, was released in July 2005. Nevermore then toured on Dave Mustaine's Gigantour during the summer of 2005. In 2006, they toured with Disturbed and also as direct support to In Flames on the second leg of its North American tour.

2006 held a bit of bad luck for Nevermore, as bassist Jim Sheppard underwent a procedure for Crohn's disease, which he has suffered from for over 15 years, and guitarist Steve Smyth was diagnosed with chronic kidney disease, and had to get a kidney transplant. Warrel Dane had previously developed type 2 diabetes, and the band was forced to cancel their show in Grand Rapids, Michigan, on May 13, 2006, due to an unspecified illness afflicting Dane.

Solo work and The Year of the Voyager (2006–2008)
On September 12, 2006, Nevermore was supposed to record its first full-length DVD live at the Zeche club in Bochum, Germany. This event was to be captured by 7 cameras and the live recording was to be produced by Andy Sneap. However, according to Nevermore's official website, on the day of the show, Warrel Dane fell ill with an infection, eventually resulting in the necessity of seeing a doctor at a hospital in Dortmund, Germany. Doctors insisted that he be kept at the hospital and the show was canceled that evening. Apologetic to their fans, Nevermore agreed with the local venue to perform the show on October 11, 2006. The double DVD set would also include a Nevermore documentary, all of the band's promo videos and past recordings from their 11-year career. The DVD was released on October 20, 2008, and is entitled The Year of the Voyager.

On August 30, 2007, it was announced that Steve Smyth would no longer be a member of the band, citing personal and business reasons for the departure. He stated that he would also be touring with Danish metal band Hatesphere as they supported Behemoth and later Dimmu Borgir, and would also be working on the release of The Esseness Project, an all-instrumental progressive rock album. Dane and Loomis entered the studio, each to record a solo album. Dane recorded Praises to the War Machine and Loomis recorded Zero Order Phase, both released in 2008. Later that year, the band released their first-ever live concert CD/DVD titled The Year of the Voyager, the only release to feature veteran touring guitarist Chris Broderick, who departed to join Megadeth.

The Obsidian Conspiracy and future (2010)
In an interview with Komodo Rock published in July, Jeff Loomis said that "I actually have six or seven songs already for the new Nevermore record. I'm about half way there, and we're going to be going into the studio probably some time in the early fall." Nevermore were one of the first bands to be confirmed for Wacken Open Air 2009, where they performed alongside many bands including Motörhead, DragonForce, and HammerFall. Nevermore entered the studio in August with producer and Soilwork guitarist Peter Wichers to record their long-awaited 7th album The Obsidian Conspiracy. The recording was completed in October 2009 and was released June 8, 2010, in America, and May 31, 2010, in the EU On June 1, 2010, Nevermore announced a North American Tour in Fall with openers Warbringer, Hatesphere, and Blackguard.

Hiatus, possible reunion and deaths (2011–2018)
On April 11, 2011, Nevermore canceled their scheduled North American tour with Symphony X. Later on April 21, 2011, longtime and founding members Jeff Loomis and Van Williams announced their departure from Nevermore, citing personal and musical differences. In addition, on May 3, 2011, it was announced that Nevermore had canceled their entire Australian tour. However, in July 2011, Warrel Dane announced that Nevermore had not broken up, and his main focus was on Sanctuary. Dane also mentioned that it would be difficult to continue Nevermore without Jeff Loomis. Both Loomis and Dane talked about the possibility of a reunion, the latter citing that the band split amicably. Dane went on to say in a later interview, that while he wanted to do another Nevermore record, he would not do it without Loomis.

On December 13, 2017, Dane died of a heart attack in São Paulo, Brazil, at the age of 56, putting an end to any possibilities of a Nevermore reunion. Former guitarist Tim Calvert died on April 30, 2018, of complications from amyotrophic lateral sclerosis. He was 52.

Musical style
Nevermore's main sound is difficult to categorize, containing various styles such as progressive metal, power metal, modern hard rock, classic heavy metal, and thrash metal. They also have used death metal traits such as low-tuned and fast-paced riffing. The press have used several other genres to describe Nevermore's sound including groove metal and progressive metal. In an interview on The Hard Report, singer Warrel Dane casually remarked "...power metal, or whatever Metal this is." However, in an interview at Metalmania in 2006, Dane did not explicitly disagree with the many genres the band has been put in over the years, but he stated "I don't think we're power metal."

Band members

Final line-up
Warrel Dane – lead vocals (1992–2011; died 2017)
Jim Sheppard – bass (1992–2011)
Jeff Loomis – guitars, backing vocals (1992–2011)
Van Williams – drums (1994–2011)

Former members
Mark Arrington – drums (1992–1994)
Pat O'Brien – guitars (1996–1997)
Tim Calvert – guitars (1997–2000; died 2018)
Steve Smyth – guitars (2004–2006)

Live members
Curran Murphy – guitars (2000–2001, 2003–2004)
Adam Gardner – percussion (1995–1996)
James MacDonough – bass (2006)
Chris Broderick – guitars (2001–2003, 2006–2007)
Tim Johnston – bass (2007)
Attila Vörös – guitars (2010–2011)
Dagna Silesia – bass (2011)

Timeline

Discography

Studio albums
Nevermore (1995)
The Politics of Ecstasy (1996)
Dreaming Neon Black (1999)
Dead Heart in a Dead World (2000)
Enemies of Reality (2003)
This Godless Endeavor (2005)
The Obsidian Conspiracy (2010)

References

External links

Nevermore on Myspace

1991 establishments in Washington (state)
2011 disestablishments in Washington (state)
Century Media Records artists
Heavy metal musical groups from Washington (state)
Musical groups established in 1991
Musical groups disestablished in 2011
Musical groups from Seattle
Musical quintets